Ratenice is a municipality and village in Kolín District in the Central Bohemian Region of the Czech Republic. It has about 600 inhabitants. It is located in the Polabí lowlands.

References

Villages in Kolín District